Ahom is a Unicode block containing characters used for writing the Ahom alphabet, which was used to write the Ahom language spoken by the Ahom people in Assam between the 13th and the 18th centuries. 

The block size was expanded by 16 code points in Unicode version 14.0 (version 13:  → version 14), and 7 more characters were defined. This is the first block to be expanded since Unicode version 1.1.

History
The following Unicode-related documents record the purpose and process of defining specific characters in the Ahom block:

References 

Unicode blocks